Mast Ali (born 1980) is an Indian actor and dialogue writer who is known for his Hyderabadi dialect humour. He is widely known as Saleem Pheku from the movie The Angrez.

Although he was not the lead character, many considered him to be a show stealer. He has also acted in Hyderabad Nawabs and Hyderabadi Bakra. Moreover, it was his Hyderabadi lehja (dialect) used in both the films that contributed immensely to their overall success. Few other movies in which he acted are Half Fry, Berozgaar, Hungama in Dubai and Zabardast. In 2015, he debuted in the Telugu film industry with the movie, Surya vs Surya. In 2019, he debuted in the Bhojpuri film industry with the movie, Jai-Veeru.

Filmography

See also
 Aziz Naser

References

External links
 

Living people
Male actors from Hyderabad, India
1980 births